The 2022 mid-year rugby union internationals (also known as the summer internationals in the Northern Hemisphere) were international rugby union matches that were mostly played in the Southern Hemisphere during the July international window. For the first time since 2018 all leading Northern Hemisphere teams toured, following a cancelled calendar in 2020 and a largely reversed calendar in 2021.

South Africa hosted Wales for a first three-test series, Wales travelling to South Africa for the first time since 2014; this was the first three-test series between the two sides. Also playing a first three-test series against their opposition were Scotland, who played Argentina in what was Argentina's first set of home games since 2019. New Zealand hosted Ireland for their first three-test series since 2012. Ireland also played two matches against the Māori All Blacks. France travelled to Japan for a two-test series, which was the first official tour of Japan for Les Bleus, having only ever toured as an XV side in 1984. Italy embarked on a tour of Europe, playing away to Portugal, Romania and Georgia, teams they had not played outside a competition environment since 2004. It was also Portugal's first match against a Six Nations country since the 2007 Rugby World Cup.

Several Tier-2 nations also toured, with Uruguay travelling to Japan for a two-test series before later hosting Romania for a two-test series. Spain and Belgium travelled to Canada, with Belgium touring outside a competition for the first time since playing Hong Kong in 2013.

With some teams still involved in the 2023 Rugby World Cup qualifying process, typical touring / hosting sides played one-off matches in preparation for their respective Qualification matches; Chile hosted an historic match against Scotland in an uncapped 'A' match, Netherlands hosted Zimbabwe, Italy A played Namibia and the United States hosted the French Barbarians.

Series

Tours

Fixtures

10 June

18/19 June

Notes:
 Daichi Akiyama, Shunsuke Asaoka, Koji Iino, Koga Nezuka, Kota Kaishi, Sione Lavemai, Taira Main, Syuhei Takeuchi, Koki Takeyama (all Japan), Santiago Álvarez, Lucas Bianchi, Carlos Deus, Tomás Etcheverry and Emiliano Faccenini (all Uruguay) made their international debuts.

Notes:
 Alex Dombrandt (England) had been named to start but withdrew ahead of the game due to injury and was replaced by Callum Chick.
 This is the Barbarians' biggest winning margin over England, surpassing the 20-point difference set in 2004.
 Will Skelton became the first player to be red-carded while playing for the Barbarians.

25 June

Notes:
 Yukio Morikawa (Japan) had been named on the bench, but withdrew ahead of the game and was replaced by Shogo Miura.
 Lee Seung-Sin, Gerhard van den Heever, Sanaila Waqa (all Japan), Bautista Basso and Matías Franco (both Uruguay) made their international debuts.

Notes:
 This is the first time that these two teams have played each other.
 Zimbabwe play a friendly test match in Europe for the first time since 1989, when they played Italy in Treviso.

Notes:
 Manfredi Albanese, Giacomo Da Re and Ion Neculai (all Italy) made their international debuts.
 This is the first time since 1996 that Portugal has hosted a Tier 1 nation in a full test match.
 This was the first time an all-female officiating team was appointed to a men's international, and for a female official to officiate as referee a men's Six Nations team.

Notes:
 Despite not being a full capped test-match, this was the first time these two teams have played each other.
 This is the first time that Chile has hosted a Tier 1 nation (outside of any competition) since hosting a France XV side in 2005.

29 June

1 July

Notes:
 Victor Leon (Romania) and Alessandro Garbisi (Italy) made their international debuts.
 This was the first time since 2004, the last time Romania hosted Italy, that these two teams have met outside a World Cup*

Notes:
 Takuya Yamasawa (Japan) had been named to start but was replaced by Lee Seung-Sin ahead of the game, who was replaced on the bench by Shane Gates.
 Yukio Morikawa, Taichi Takahashi (both Japan), Thomas Jolmès, Yoan Tanga and Thomas Lavault (France) made their international debuts.
 This was the first time Japan hosted a test match against France.

Notes:
 Leicester Fainga'anuku and Pita Gus Sowakula (both New Zealand) made their international debuts.
 Finlay Bealham was originally named on the Ireland bench, but was replaced on match day by Tom O'Toole.

Notes:
 Quade Cooper (Australia) had been named to start but pulled up injured in the warm-up and was replaced by Noah Lolesio. James O'Connor replaced Lolesio on the bench.
 Caderyn Neville, Dave Porecki (both Australia), Henry Arundell and Jack van Poortvliet (both England) made their international debuts.
 This was Australia's first win over England since the 2015 Rugby World Cup pool stage, breaking an eight-match losing streak to England.

Notes:
 Elrigh Louw, Salmaan Moerat (both South Africa) and Tommy Reffell (Wales) made their international debuts.

Notes:
 Callum Botcher, Dawson Fatoric, Lindsey Stevens (all Canada), Marius Dehoust, Noé Finfe, Joachim Piérart and Lucas Rassinfosse (all Belgium) made their international debuts.
 This was the first time that Canada have hosted Belgium.
 This was Canada's largest winning margin over Belgium, surpassing the 31-point difference set in 2010.

Notes:
 Tomás Cubelli (Argentina) had been named to start but withdrew ahead of the game and was replaced by Gonzalo Bertranou, who was replaced by Juan Imhoff on the bench.
 Joel Sclavi (Argentina) made his international debut.
 This was Argentina's first win over Scotland since 2011, and their first home win over the Scots since 2008.
 This was Argentina's first home game since they played South Africa in August 2019, nearly 3 years ago (1,057 days since their last home game)

9/10 July

Notes:
 Max Spring (France) made his international debut.
 With this win, and other subsequent results the weekend before, France are ranked number 1 on the World Rugby Rankings for the first time.

Notes:
 Scott Barrett (New Zealand) earned his 50th test cap.
 Folau Fakatava and Aidan Ross (both New Zealand) made their international debuts.
 This was Ireland's first win over New Zealand on New Zealand soil.
 This was New Zealand's first loss at Forsyth Barr Stadium, and their first loss in Dunedin since 2009.
 With this loss, and other subsequent results the weekend before, New Zealand dropped to fourth in the World Rugby Rankings, their lowest ranking.

Notes:
 Jack Willis was originally named among the England substitutes, but pulled out prior to the match due to a rib injury. He was replaced on the bench by Will Joseph.
 Nick Frost (Australia), Tommy Freeman, Guy Porter and Will Joseph (England) made their international debuts.

Notes:
 Kurt-Lee Arendse, Deon Fourie, Ntuthuko Mchunu, Ruan Nortjé, Evan Roos, Grant Williams (all South Africa) and Sam Wainwright (Wales) made their international debuts.
 This was Wales' first test victory over South Africa on South African soil.
 This loss meant Australia, New Zealand and South Africa all lost at home on the same weekend for the first time.

Notes:
 Hamish Watson (Scotland) earned his 50th test cap.
 Kyle Rowe (Scotland) made his international debut.

Notes:
 Nika Abuladze (Georgia) made his international debut.
 This was Georgia's first win over Italy, and their first over any Tier 1 nation.

Notes:
 Diego Magno (Uruguay) became the first player from the Americas region to earn 100 test caps.
 Gheorghe Gajion and Ștefan Iancu (both Romania) made their international debuts.

Notes:
 This was Spain's first victory over Canada.
 Jack McRogers, Piers von Dadelszen (both Canada), Ekain Imaz and Ignacio Piñeiro (both Spain) made their international debuts.

12 July

Notes:
 This was Ireland's first win over the Māori All Blacks.
 This was the Māori All Blacks first home loss since 2017.

16/17 July

Notes:
 New Zealand's Scott Barrett (starting XV) and Aidan Ross had both been named in the team, but withdrew from the team ahead of kick-off. Akira Ioane replaced Barrett in the starting XV with Tupou Vaa'i joining the bench, whilst Karl Tu'inukuafe replaced Ross.
 Roger Tuivasa-Sheck (New Zealand) made his international debut, making him the fourth person to represent New Zealand in rugby union after having previously represented them in Rugby League.
 Rieko Ioane (New Zealand) earned his 50th test cap.
 Ireland win their first test series in New Zealand.
 This is the first time since 1994, and just the fifth in history, that New Zealand have lost a home test series.
 This the first time since 1998 that New Zealand have lost back-to-back home test matches.
 This is the first time that Ireland have won back-to-back matches against New Zealand.
 With this win, Ireland claim top spot in the World Rugby Rankings for the first time since 2019.

Notes:
 Nic White (Australia) earned his 50th test cap.
 Suliasi Vunivalu (Australia) made his international debut.
 This was the first test match held at the Sydney Cricket Ground since Australia hosted Argentina in 1986.
 England claim the Ella-Mobbs Trophy (previously the Cook Cup) for the first time. 

Notes:
 Mikheil Babunashvili, Beka Shvangiradze (both Georgia), Martim Belo and Domingos Cabral (both Portugal) made their international debuts.
 Alexander Todua (Georgia) earned his 100th test cap, the fourth Georgian player to do so.

Notes:
 Taulupe Faletau was originally named to start for Wales, but pulled out during the warm-up. He was replaced in the starting line-up by Josh Navidi, whose place in the bench was taken by Taine Basham.
 Gareth Anscombe was originally named on the bench for Wales, but pulled out during the warm-up. His place was taken by Rhys Patchell.
 Eben Etzebeth (South Africa) earned his 100th test cap.
 Bongi Mbonambi (South Africa) earned his 50th test cap.
 George North (Wales) earned his 105th test cap, surpassing Stephen Jones' record to become Wales' most capped back.

Notes:
 Lautaro Bazán, Ignacio Ruiz (both Argentina), Ollie Smith and Glen Young (both Scotland) made their international debuts.
 Matías Orlando (Argentina) and Zander Fagerson (Scotland) earned their 50th test caps.
 Argentina win a home test series for the first time since beating Ireland 2–0 in 2007.
 Argentina win their first three-test series over Scotland, and their first series win against Scotland since their two-test series win in 1994.

Notes:
 Nicolás Freitas (Uruguay) and Johannes van Heerden (Romania) earned their 50th test caps.
 Mihai Mureșan and Gabriel Pop (both Romania) made their international debuts.

Notes

See also
 2022 end-of-year rugby union internationals
 2022 World Rugby Pacific Nations Cup
 2023 Rugby World Cup – Africa qualification
 2023 Rugby World Cup – Americas qualification
 2023 Rugby World Cup – Asia qualification

References

2022
2022 in rugby union